The phrase 'watches of the night' has been used since at least the Book of Mishna: "watches of the night": the night-time; watch originally each of the three or four periods of time, during which a watch or guard was kept, into which the night was divided by the Jews and Romans". The phrase occurs several places in the Old Testament (Psalm 63:6; 119:148; Lamentation 2:19) and it is suggested in the New Testament (Gospel of Mark 13:35).

This has also been used in several works of literature as a cliché for what is also called 'the wee small hours', or 'the early morning', often with connotations of blackness (both of night and of the spirits) and depression (e. g. Longfellow wrote in The Cross of Snow (1879) "In the long, sleepless watches of the night"). Kipling uses this, along with a pun on the word 'watches': the story turns on two identical timepieces.

"Watches of the Night" is a short story by Rudyard Kipling. It was first published in the Civil and Military Gazette on March 25, 1887; in book form, first in the first Indian edition of Plain Tales from the Hills in 1888; and in the many subsequent editions of that collection. It is one of the "Tales" which deals with the tense, enclosed society of the British in India, and the levels of gossip and malice that could be engendered therein. "Watches of the Night," like many of Kipling's works, has a punning, allusive title.
Both the Colonel, commanding the regiment, and a Subaltern in the Regiment, Platte, a poor man, own Waterbury watches. (These are fob or Pocket watches, not wrist watches: Each usually hangs from a chain.) The Waterbury (from the town of Waterbury, Connecticut is a mass-produced and not especially prestigious make. The Colonel, who affects to be "a horsey man" (but is not) wears his watch, not on a chain, but on a leather strap made from the lip-strap of a horse's harness; Platte wears his from a leather guard, presumably because he can afford no better. One night the two men change - in a hurry - at the Club, and, not unnaturally, take each other's watch. They go on their separate ways. Later that night, as Platte returns home, his horse rears and upsets his cart, throwing him to the ground outside Mrs Larkyn's house, where his watch falls loose. The Colonel loses his watch, which slips on to the floor - where a native bearer finds it (and keeps it). Going home in a hired carriage, the Colonel finds the driver drunk, and returns late. His wife, who is religious (and, we have been told "manufactured the Station scandal"), is disinclined to believe him.

In the morning, Mrs Larkyn, who has been a victim of the Colonel's wife scandal-mongering, finds the watch that Platte has dropped, and shows it to him. He affects to believe it is "...disgusting! Shocking old man!". They send the Colonel's watch (which is the one Platte had been wearing) to the Colonel's wife. She attacks the Colonel, being wholly convinced of Original Sin - and begins to realize the harm and pain that unfounded suspicion can cause - and has caused her victims.

That is really the moral of the story. "The mistrust and the tragedy of it," says Kipling, "are killing the Colonel's Wife, and are making the Colonel wretched.

All quotations in this article have been taken from the Uniform Edition of Plain Tales from the Hills published by Macmillan & Co., Limited in London in 1899. The text is that of the third edition (1890), and the author of the article has used his own copy of the 1923 reprint. Further comment, including page-by-page notes, can be found on the Kipling Society's website, at http://www.kipling.org.uk/rg_watches1.htm.

References

1887 short stories
Short stories by Rudyard Kipling
Rudyard Kipling stories about India
Works originally published in the Civil and Military Gazette